What Love May Bring is a 2010 French film directed by Claude Lelouch. It is also known as What Love May Bring.

Plot
Ilva is a woman who falls in love too easily.  Unaware and unconcerned about how her passion may be perceived, she finds herself having to live with the consequences of her actions.  First, in the middle of the German occupation in Paris, she falls for a Nazi, which indirectly leads to the death of her father. For many, her relationship was interpreted as her collaboration with the Nazis. Her next love story, however, bring additional tragedy.  During the liberation of France in '44, when she is violently summoned to answer for her relationship with the German, she is saved by two Americans GIs, one white and one black. She falls in love with both these men, at the same time.  Her inability to choose between them, creates conflict, unhappiness and murder.

The film combines history, music, and a little absurdity to treat the subject of love, passion, and destiny.

Cast
 Dominique Pinon as Maurice Lemoine
 Jacky Ido as Bob Kane
 Anouk Aimée as Madame Blum
 Audrey Dana as Ilva / Simone / Sophia
 Gisèle Casadesus as Old Ilva 
 Kristina Cepraga as Brigitte Bardot
 Samuel Labarthe as Horst
 Gilles Lemaire as Jim Singer
 Laurent Couson as Simon
 Judith Magre as Esther 
 Raphaël Haroche as Louis
 Lise Lamétrie as Madame Dubois
 Christine Citti as The poisoner
 Piotr Polak as a The German soldier
 Zinedine Soualem as The accordionist
 Liane Foly as The street singer

References

External links

 

2010 films
2010s French-language films
2010 drama films
Films directed by Claude Lelouch
Films shot in Romania
French drama films
2010s French films